Wachtberg is a municipality in the Rhein-Sieg district, of North Rhine-Westphalia, Germany. It is situated approximately 15 km south of Bonn. In 2021 the Wachtberg municipality had approximately 20,352 inhabitants.

The municipality was formed 1969 as a merger of 13 now incorporated villages. The town-hall is in the village of Berkum, approximately in the center of the area.
The Rodderberg mountain is in the east of the Wachtberg district.

The municipality is named after another volcanic mountain, the Wachtberg, (extinct for 25 million years, now with a height of 258 m) that is situated near the centre of the municipality.

Landmarks 

Four water castles are still inhabited:
 Burg Münchhausen (near Adendorf)
 Wasserburg Adendorf (near Adendorf)
 Burg Gudenau (near Villip)
 Burg Odenhausen (near Berkum)

Several water mills are situated on the streams, of which the Broicher Mühle near Villip is in continuous use since 886.

At the top of the mountain Wachtberg there is a cenotaph, built in 1923 by 10 of the 13 villages.

The radome near Berkum has a diameter of 49 m.

In contrast to this several villages have ensembles of timber framed houses.

Niederbachem 
Niederbachem is the biggest village within Wachtberg with 4276 inhabitants (July 2018).

References

External links 
 Official site 
 Tourist brochure